Saunoamaali’i Karanina Sumeo is a Samoan-New Zealand civil servant. In 2018 she was appointed EEO (Equal Employment Opportunities) Commissioner for the New Zealand Human Rights Commission.

Life 
Sumeo was born in Vailima, Upolu, Samoa and emigrated to New Zealand with her family when she was 10. She completed a bachelor of science degree at the University of Auckland and a master's degree in social policy at Massey University. She also holds a PhD in public policy from Auckland University of Technology.

Sumeo held positions with Oranga Tamariki, the Ministry of Social Development, Ministry of Pacific Island Affairs, Tertiary Education Commission, and the Auckland District Health Board prior to her appointment to the Human Rights Commission.

References

Living people
Samoan emigrants to New Zealand
Auckland University of Technology alumni
Massey University alumni
University of Auckland alumni
New Zealand public servants
Year of birth missing (living people)